The 2015 IIHF Women's World Championship Division II was three international ice hockey tournaments organised by the International Ice Hockey Federation. The Division II Group A tournament was played in Dumfries, Great Britain, from 30 March to 5 April 2015, the Division II Group B tournament was played in Jaca, Spain, from 7 to 13 March 2015, and the Division II Group B Qualification tournament was played from 18 to 21 February 2015 in Hong Kong.

Venues

Division II Group A

Participants

Match officials
4 Referees and 7 linesman were selected for the tournament.

Referees
 Kristine Morrison
 Radka Růžičková
 Kyoko Ugajin
 Yana Zuyeva

Linesman
 Melanie Bauer
 Stephanie Cole
 Marine Dinant
 Elise Hauan
 Leigh Hetherington
 Jenni Jaatinen
 Tatiana Kasášová
 Amy Lack

Final standings

Results
All times are local (UTC+1).

Awards and statistics

Awards
Best players selected by the directorate:
 Best Goalkeeper:  Nicole Jackson
 Best Defenseman:  Jodie-Leigh Bloom
 Best Forward:  Alyona Fux
Source: IIHF.com

Scoring leaders
List shows the top skaters sorted by points, then goals.

GP = Games played; G = Goals; A = Assists; Pts = Points; +/− = Plus/minus; PIM = Penalties in minutes; POS = Position
Source: IIHF.com

Goaltending leaders
Only the top five goaltenders, based on save percentage, who have played at least 40% of their team's minutes, are included in this list.

TOI = Time on Ice (minutes:seconds); SA = Shots against; GA = Goals against; GAA = Goals against average; Sv% = Save percentage; SO = Shutouts
Source: IIHF.com

Division II Group B

Participants

Match officials
4 Referees and 7 linesman were selected for the tournament.

Referees
 Nikoleta Celárová
 Elena Ivanova
 Liu Chunhua
 Ulrike Winklmayr

Linesman
 Trine Phillipsen
 Joanna Pobożniak
 Oxana Shestakova
 Viera Šilhavíková
 Olga Steinberg
 Tereza Štreitová
 Cathrine Vestheim

Final standings

Results
All times are local (UTC+1).

Awards and statistics

Awards
Best players selected by the directorate:
 Best Goalkeeper:  Monica Renteria
 Best Defenseman:  Vanesa Abrisqueta
 Best Forward:  Pia Pren
Source: IIHF.com

Scoring leaders
List shows the top skaters sorted by points, then goals.

GP = Games played; G = Goals; A = Assists; Pts = Points; +/− = Plus/minus; PIM = Penalties in minutes; POS = Position
Source: IIHF.com

Goaltending leaders
Only the top five goaltenders, based on save percentage, who have played at least 40% of their team's minutes, are included in this list.

TOI = Time on Ice (minutes:seconds); SA = Shots against; GA = Goals against; GAA = Goals against average; Sv% = Save percentage; SO = Shutouts
Source: IIHF.com

Division II Group B Qualification

Participants

Match officials
3 Referees and 5 linesman were selected for the tournament.

Referees
 Ainslie Gardner
 Etsuko Wada
 Xu Jingwei

Linesman
 Fu Zhennan
 Lee Kyung-sun
 Alicia Thomasen
 Yuka Tochigi
 Wang Hui

Final standings

Results
All times are local (UTC+8).

Awards and statistics

Awards
Best players selected by the directorate:
 Best Goalkeeper:  Lee Jenny Kai-Chin
 Best Defenseman:  Tina Lisichkova
 Best Forward:  Çağla Baktıroğlu
Source: IIHF.com

Scoring leaders
List shows the top skaters sorted by points, then goals.

GP = Games played; G = Goals; A = Assists; Pts = Points; +/− = Plus/minus; PIM = Penalties in minutes; POS = Position
Source: IIHF.com

Leading goaltenders
Only the top five goaltenders, based on save percentage, who have played at least 40% of their team's minutes, are included in this list.

TOI = Time on Ice (minutes:seconds); SA = Shots against; GA = Goals against; GAA = Goals against average; Sv% = Save percentage; SO = Shutouts
Source: IIHF.com

References

External links
 Official website of IIHF

II
2015 IIHF Women's World Championship Division II
2015 IIHF Women's World Championship Division II
W
World
2015 IIHF Women's World Championship Division II
2015 IIHF Women's World Championship Division II
2015
2015
2015 in Scottish women's sport